Directorate of Military Intelligence or Military Intelligence Directorate may refer to:

Directorate of Military Intelligence (India)
Directorate of Military Intelligence (Ireland)
Directorate of Military Intelligence (Nepal)
Directorate of Military Intelligence (Sri Lanka)
Directorate of Military Intelligence (United Kingdom)
Military Intelligence Directorate (Israel)
Military Intelligence (Pakistan)
Military Intelligence Directorate (Syria)

See also
Military Intelligence (disambiguation)
National Intelligence Service (disambiguation)
Foreign Intelligence service (disambiguation)
State Intelligence Service (disambiguation)
Federal Intelligence Service (disambiguation)
General Intelligence Directorate (disambiguation)
Intelligence Bureau (disambiguation)